Coleus cremnus, synonym Plectranthus cremnus, is a rare herb only found in a few sites in the north coast of New South Wales. It occurs in shallow sandy soils in rocky coastal headlands such as Evans Head, Lennox Head and Sawtell. The foliage is hairy with a pleasant geranium type scent. Purple tinged blue flowers occur at any time of the year. A few erect flowering branchlets rise from the usual low creeping form.

References

 

cremnus
Flora of New South Wales
Endangered flora of Australia
Taxa named by Barry John Conn